Mylabris sennae is a species of beetle belonging to the Meloidae family.

Distribution
This species occurs in Eastern Africa.

References

 Synopsis of the described Coleoptera of the World

Meloidae
Beetles described in 1895
Fauna of East Africa